The Château Trompette  is a French château in the commune of Vanxains in Dordogne department in the Nouvelle-Aquitaine region of south-western France.

The current residents are the Riom family.

Presentation
The Château Trompette is located in the west of the Dordogne department, one kilometre north-west of the town of Vanxains, near the intersection of roads D43 and National Road NR708. It is a private property.

It is made up of a rectangular group of buildings dominated by three towers: one round tower to the north-west and two square towers to the south and the north-east.

History
The Château was built in the 19th century on the site of an old farm

Galerie

References

Châteaux in Dordogne